Tracy Valley is an unincorporated community in Platte County, Nebraska, United States.

History
Tracy Valley was originally settled chiefly by Presbyterians from the Northern United States.

References

Unincorporated communities in Platte County, Nebraska
Unincorporated communities in Nebraska